Lantau Channel is a channel south of Fan Lau Kok of Lantau Island in Hong Kong. The channel is also on the water boundary between Hong Kong and mainland China. Across the border is the islands of Guishan Dao, Niutou Dao and Zhongxin Dao of Wanshan Archipelago.

The channel is on the strategic sea route and defense structures like Fan Lau Fort was built to defend the territories.

External links
Aerial image from Google Map

Channels of Hong Kong
Geography of Zhuhai
Fan Lau